Biduk-e Bala (also Romanized as Bīdūk-e Bālā) is a village in Nazil Rural District, Nukabad District, Khash County, Sistan and Baluchestan Province, Iran. At the 2006 census, its population was 10, in 4 families.

References 

Populated places in Khash County